Ranchi district  is the most populous district of Jharkhand state in eastern India. Ranchi, the capital of Jharkhand, is the district headquarters. It was established as a district in 1899.

History

Iron slag, potsherds and iron tools have been found in the Chota Nagpur plateau dated to 1400 BCE.

Magadha Empire exercised indirect control over the territory, which lasted until the reign of the Ashoka. Kalinga rulers are believed to have ravaged the region during their expeditions to Rajgir and Pataliputra. Armies of Samudra Gupta passed through the region on their expedition to Deccan. After the decline of the Guptas, Phani Mukut Rai established the Nagvanshi dynasty c. 1000 CE, which ruled Ranchi district and part of Chota Nagpur Plateau as a sovereign king for almost next 1000 years. Khukhragarh was one of the capitals of Nagvanshi dynasty.

With the expansion of the Mughal Empire, the Nagvanshis were forced to pay tribute, but they continued to rule and administer independently until the advent of the East India Company. Thakur Vishwanath Shahdeo, Pandey Ganpat Rai, Tikait Umrao Singh and Sheikh Bhikhari played pivotal role in Indian Rebellion of 1857. During the period of the British Raj, Adivasis and other locals of the Chotanagpur Plateau continued to oppose the subjugation by the British, and the region witnessed a number of uprisings and revolts.

Geography

Climate

Ranchi has a humid subtropical climate. However, due to its position and the forests around the city, it is known for its pleasant climate. Its climate is the primary reason why Ranchi was once the summer capital of the undivided State of Bihar. Ranchi used to be a preferable hill station in the past. Temperature ranges from maximum 42 to 20 °C during summer, and from 25 to 0 °C during winter. December and January are the coolest months with temperature getting to freezing point in some places of the city. The annual rainfall is about 1430 mm (56.34 inches). From June to September the rainfall is about 1,100 mm.
Ranchi is located at 23°21′N 85°20′E.[5] The total area covered by the Ranchi municipal area is 175.12 square kilometres and the average elevation of the city is 651 m above sea level.

Ranchi is located on the southern part of the Chota Nagpur plateau which forms the eastern edge of the Deccan plateau. Ranchi is referred to as the "City of Waterfalls", due to the presence of numerous large and small falls of around the close vicinity of the city. The most popular ones are Dassam Falls, Hundru Falls, Jonha Falls, Hirni Falls and Panchghagh Falls.

The Subarnarekha river and its tributaries constitute the local river system. Dams in Kanke, Rukka and Hatia have been built over these channels to cater to the water requirements of majority the population.

Ranchi has a hilly topography and its combination with dense tropical forests ensures that it enjoys a comparatively moderate climate compared to the rest of the state. Previously, it was accorded a 'hill station' status during the British rule. Rapid population growth and industrialization have caused considerable change in the weather pattern and rise in average temperatures. This has resulted in gradual loss of this "Hill Station" like status.
It also has numerous dams constructed in different regions of the city inside and on the outskirts.

Politics

 |}

Economy
In 2006 the Indian government named Ranchi one of the country's 250 most backward districts (out of a total of 640). It is one of the 23 districts in Jharkhand currently receiving funds from the Backward Regions Grant Fund Programme (BRGF). In the aspirational districts, Ranchi have improved.

Divisions
Presently, Ranchi district is divided into 2 sub-divisions and 14 administrative blocks. On 12 September 2007, Khunti district was created by carving Khunti subdivision and its 6 blocks out of Ranchi district. Ranchi sub-division is further divided into 11 blocks: Angara, Burmu, Bero, Chanho, Kanke, Lapung, Mandar, Namkum, Ormanjhi, Ratu and Silli. Bundu sub-division comprises 3 blocks: Bundu, Sonahatu, and Tamar, The district has 7 Assembly constituencies, namely, Tamar (ST), Silli, Khijri (ST), Ranchi, Hatia, Kanke (SC), and Mandar (ST). Silli, Khijri, Ranchi, Hatia and Kanke are part of Ranchi Lok Sabha constituency.

Education
Ranchi district boasts of many premier institutes in the field of higher education. This may be a reason that Ranchi has an average literacy rate of 77.13%(census 2011), higher than the national average of 74.04%: male literacy is 85.63%, and female literacy is 68.2%.Some of the popular schools for education in ranchi are Loyola Convent School, Delhi Public School, Jawahar Vidya Mandir, Kairali School, St.Xavier's School, St. Thomas School and Bishop Westcott.

Ranchi University, presently comprising 35 constituent colleges and 29 affiliated colleges, was established in 1960. One of its constituent college, St. Xavier's College at Ranchi was established in 1944. Birla Institute of Technology at Mesra, Ranchi was established in 1955. Birsa Agricultural University at Ranchi was established in 1981.

IIM Ranchi, the eighth Indian Institute of Management was established at Ranchi in 2010. It currently offers a two-year PGDM as its flagship program and has launched PFPEX recently for research work.

National University of Study and Research in Law, Ranchi was established by a legislative act of the Government of Jharkhand as the fourteenth national law university of India . It offers graduate and post-graduate courses in law.

Xavier Institute of Social Service (XISS), Ranchi started in the year of 1955 with an intention to educate young graduates in the field of social work and management programs. This department stated as the extension department of St Xavier's college of Ranchi. In the year 1975, the department registered itself as a separate institute and established their new campus. The isolated campus of the Xavier Institute of Social Service is located in the Purulia Road, Ranchi. The institute offers graduate and post-graduate course in management studies.

The Institute of Science & Management (ISM), formerly known as Indian Institute of Science & Management had, came into being in the year 1985 with an idea of catering to the long felt need of management education to the upcoming youth of the developing region of Chgotanagpur. It offers PGDM, Hotel Management & Catering Technology (HM&CT), B.A. International Hospitality Administration (B.A. – IHA) courses.

National Institute of Foundry & Forge Technology (NIFFT) was set up by the Government of India in collaboration with UNDP-UNESCO to provide quality engineers and well trained specialists for running Manufacturing, Metallurgical, Foundry and Forge industries efficiently. Since its inception in 1966, NIFFT has earned a reputation of being a premier Institute for imparting technical education, training, research and development and consultancy in the fields of manufacturing, metallurgy & foundry and forge technologies. Apart from that with the expansion of the institute, the allied fields of information technology, Industrial Engineering and Environmental Engineering have also received impetus.

Rajendra Institute of Medical Sciences (RIMS), a medical institute of Ranchi University in Ranchi, was established in 2002 by upgrading the then Rajendra Medical College Hospital (RMCH) which was established in 1960. The courses offered are MBBS, M.D., Mch Neurosurgery, BDS, Bsc nursing, Msc nursing, Paramedical and Physiotherapy.

The Central Institute of Psychiatry, Ranchi is an institute offering higher level study in the domain of medical education. The institute also functions as a psychiatry unit for patients of all age groups. The Central Institute of Psychiatry, Ranchi is jointly administered by the Ministry of Health and Family Welfare and Directorate General of Health Services. The Central Institute of Psychiatry in Ranchi accepts psychiatric patients from all over India and also from Bhutan and Nepal. The institute offers Post-Graduate medical courses. The Central Institute of Psychiatry of Ranchi teaches higher level medical courses in Clinical Psychology, Psychiatry, Psychiatric Nursing and Psychiatric Social Work. Candidates may also pursue doctoral studies in Clinical Psychology. The British established this hospital on 17 May 1918 with the name of Ranchi European Lunatic Asylum. It may be worth noting that this Institute has been the most premier centre for mental health in the country and it has many firsts to its credit. For example, to mention only a few, the first Occupational Therapy Department in 1922, ECT in 1943, psychosurgery and neurosurgery in 1947, clinical psychology and Electroencephalography (EEG) departments in 1948, a full-fledged neuropathology section in 1952, the first use of Lithium in 1952 and chlorpromazine in 1953.

The Central University of Jharkhand is a Central University, established by an act of Indian Parliament (Act no. 25 of 2009) in 2009. Like other Central Universities of India it is a teaching and research university. CUJ offers 50+ courses which includes a wide range of five year "Integrated Masters Programs" in more than 20 disciplines, 16 postgraduate programs and Ph.D. in almost 20 disciplines. As of now the university is functional in its temporary 45-acre campus located at Brambe, Mandar.

Demographics

According to the 2011 census Ranchi district has a population of 2,914,253, roughly equal to the nation of Jamaica or the US state of Arkansas. This gives it a ranking of 130th in India (out of a total of 640). Its population growth rate over the decade 2001-2011 was 23.9%. Ranchi has a sex ratio of 950 females for every 1000 males, and a literacy rate of 77.13%.

Hindus are 56.32%, while other religions (mainly Sarna) are 23.25%. Muslims are 14.09% and Christians are 6.66%.

Languages

At the time of the 2011 Census of India, 30.23% of the population in the district spoke Sadri, 28.08% Hindi, 8.55% Urdu, 7.52% Kurukh, 11.88% Panchpargania, 4.70% Mundari, 2.51% Bengali, 2.17% Bhojpuri and 1.17% Magahi as their first language.

Administration

Blocks/Mandals 

Ranchi district consists of 18 Blocks. The following are the list of the Blocks in Ranchi district:

References

External links

 Official government website

 
Districts of Jharkhand
1899 establishments in India